Visor om slutet is an all-acoustic folk metal EP by the Finnish band Finntroll. It was released in 2003 by Spinefarm. It was the first album to feature Tapio Wilska on vocals, and the last to feature Jan "Katla" Jämsen, who was forced into retirement in 2003 due to a tumour developing on his vocal cords.

Visor om slutet was released after a number of misfortunes befell several band members, including the death of guitarist Teemu Raimoranta, to whom the album is dedicated.  It was recorded in a cabin off in the woods near Helsinki, coined as an "acoustic experiment," and features the use of traditionally non-metal instruments such as the kazoo.  Though quite different in its sound to the folk metal-inspired Jaktens tid, the album was a relative success.

Track listing

Personnel 
 Jan "Katla" Jämsen – vocals
 Samuli "Skrymer" Ponsimaa – rhythm guitar
 Teemu "Somnium" Raimoranta – lead, rhythm & acoustic guitar, choirs
 Samu "Beast Dominator" Ruotsalainen - drums
 Henri "Trollhorn" Sorvali – keyboards
 Sami "Tundra" Uusitalo – bass
 Tapio Wilska - vocals

References 

 Finntroll - Visor Om Slutet at Discogs
 Visor om slutet at MusicBrainz
 Finntroll - Visor Om Slutet at Encyclopaedia Metallum

Finntroll albums
2003 albums
Season of Mist albums